Deanie Ip (born 25 December 1947) is a Hong Kong singer and actress. She has won the Hong Kong Film Awards once for Best Actress and three times for Best Supporting Actress. Deanie also won the Golden Horse Awards once for Best Leading Actress and twice for Best Supporting Actress; she also won a Coppa Volpi for the Best Actress at the 68th Venice International Film Festival. Her Cantopop albums were released by Universal Music Group and several local labels. A Hakka of Huiyang ancestry, she speaks Cantonese, Dapeng dialect, Mandarin and English.

Music career
In the 1980s, Ip released five albums with a local producer. After complaining about the direction of the Cantopop industry and falling out with her then label, Black and White, Ip chose to retire from music in 1988 and went into semi-retirement, with occasional roles in movies. She returned to the Cantopop scene in 2002 with an EP, which, along with a live recording of her 2002 concert in Hong Kong, were both released by Universal Music Group. In the mid-90s, she teamed up with male star Andy Hui to produce the hit duet "教我如何不愛他" (lit. "Teach me how not to love him") and again in 2004 for the award-winner "美中不足" (lit. "A minor defect in something otherwise perfect").

Film career and recognition
Ip has been recognised on several occasions for supporting actress roles except for her role in A Simple Life, where she won Coppa Volpi for the Best Actress at the 68th Venice International Film Festival.  Hong Kong's Secretary for Commerce & Economic Development Gregory So congratulated her for winning the award. Mr So said this award is not only an international recognition of Ms Ip's outstanding achievement, but a testimony of the level of excellence of the Hong Kong film industry. A Simple Life marked the 10th collaboration between Ip and actor Andy Lau, they first starred together in The Unwritten Law in 1985.

Ip has won the Best Supporting Actress awards at the Hong Kong Film Awards twice, for her roles in Dances with Dragon (11th Hong Kong Film Awards, 1991), and in My Name Ain't Suzy (5th Hong Kong Film Awards, 1985). Ip also had three other nominations for Best Supporting Actress for Wrong Wedding Trail (4th Hong Kong Film Awards, 1984), Spiritual Love (7th Hong Kong Film Awards, 1987) and for Murder (13th Hong Kong Film Awards, 1993).

She has also won Best Supporting Actress at the 36th Golden Horse Awards for Crying Heart.

Before filming A Simple Life, Ip had a 12-year hiatus from acting, about the hiatus she stated “I was viewed by some in the business as a disobedient actress who loves to play the role of a director on set. I am also not great at networking. I guess these are the reasons why I haven’t been offered a lot of work."

Politics

Ip participated in Hong Kong's 2014 Umbrella Movement, where protesters demanded electoral reform from the government. She was involved in recording Denise Ho's Cantopop song "Raise the Umbrella". The song had been described as an inspiring anthem for the pro-democracy movement. During the 2016 Hong Kong legislative election campaign, Ip expressed her support for activist Nathan Law and stated, "I believe that this young man does everything he does for Hong Kong, and for his generation."

In 2019, Ip joined the pro-democracy demonstrations during the 2019–20 Hong Kong protests. Ip was one of few Hong Kong celebrities to voice support for the protesters, leading to her songs being removed from Mainland China's music streaming platforms. Untroubled by the loss of this income stream, she continued to voice her admiration for the young protestors.

Filmography

Footnotes

References

External links

 Deannie Yip Tak-Han at hkmdb.com

1947 births
Living people
20th-century Hong Kong actresses
21st-century Hong Kong actresses
Actresses from Guangdong
Best Actress Asian Film Award winners
Cantopop singers
Hakka musicians
Hong Kong contraltos
20th-century Hong Kong women singers
Hong Kong film actresses
Hong Kong people of Hakka descent
Hong Kong television actresses
People from Huiyang
People from Shenzhen
Volpi Cup for Best Actress winners